The following is an incomplete list of festivals in Estonia.

Festivals

Film festivals in Estonia

Tallinn Black Nights Film Festival
Matsalu Nature Film Festival
Pärnu International Documentary and Science Film Festival

Music festivals in Estonia

References

External links

 

Estonia
Estonia
Festivals in Estonia
Festivals